Elaeus or Elaious was a town of ancient Greece on the island of Naxos. It is cited, along with Melas, in an ancient inscription dated to the 3rd century BCE.

Its site is unlocated.

References

Populated places in the ancient Aegean islands
Former populated places in Greece
Ancient Naxos
Lost ancient cities and towns